France had a permanent embassy to the Ottoman Empire beginning in 1535, during the time of King Francis I and Sultan Suleiman the Magnificent. It is considered to have been the direct predecessor of the modern-day embassy to the Republic of Turkey.

List of ambassadors

Under the Ancien Régime
Ambassadors of Ancien Régime France. Embassy established in Constantinople.
The first ambassador was preceded by an envoy: Jean Frangipani.
Jean de la Forét 1535–1538
Antoine de Rincon 1538–1541
Antoine Escalin des Eymars 1541–1547
Gabriel de Luetz d'Aramont 1547–1553
Michel de Codignac 1553–1556
Jean Cavenac de la Vigne 1556–1566
Guillaume de Grandchamp de Grantrie 1566–1571
François de Noailles 1571–1575
Gilles de Noailles 1575–1579
Jacques de Germigny 1579–1585
Jacques Savary de Lancosme 1585–1589
François Savary de Brèves 1589–1607
Jean-François de Gontaut-Biron 1607–1611
Achille de Harlay 1611–1620
Philippe de Harlay 1620–1631
Henry de Gournay 1631–1639
Jean de La Hay 1639–1665
Denis de La Haye 1665–1670
Charles Marie François Olier, marquis de Nointel 1670–1679
Gabriel de Guilleragues 1679–1686
Pierre de Girardin 1686–1689
Pierre Antoine Castagneres 1689–1692
Charles de Ferriol 1692–1711
Pierre Puchot 1711–1716
Jean-Louis d'Usson 1716
Jean-Baptiste Louis Picon 1724–1728
Louis Sauveur Villeneuve 1728–1741
Michel-Ange Castellane 1741–1747
Roland Puchot 1747–1755
Charles Gravier de Vergennes 1755–1768
François Emmanuel Guignard 1768–1784
Marie-Gabriel-Florent-Auguste de Choiseul-Gouffier 1784–1792

French Revolution and First French Empire
Ambassadors under the French Revolution and First French Empire.
Charles Louis Huguet 1792–1796 – in name only
Raymond de Verninac Saint-Maur (1795 -1797)
Jean-Baptiste Annibal Aubert du Bayet 1796–1797
Guillaume Marie-Anne Brune 1802–1806
Horace François Sébastiani 1806–1812
Antoine François Andréossy 1812–1815

1815–1914
Ambassadors under the Bourbon Restoration, July Monarchy, Second Republic, Second Empire and Third Republic.
Charles François de Riffardeau, marquis de Rivière 1815–1821
 1821–1823
Armand Charles Guilleminot 1823–1832
Albin Reine Roussin 1832–1839
Edouard Pontois 1839–1841
 1844–1851
Charles La Valette 1851–1853
Edmond de Lacour 1853-1853
Achille Baraguey d'Hilliers 1853–1855
Edouard Antoine de Thouvenel 1855–1860
Charles La Valette 1860–1861
Lionel Désiré Marie François René Moustiers 1861–1866
 1866–1870
Louis Dubreuil-Héliou La Gueronnière 1870–1871
Eugène-Melchior de Vogüé 1871–1875
Jean-François Guillaume Bourgoing 1875–1877
 1877–1880
 1880–1882
Emmanuel Henri Victurnien de Noailles 1882–1886
 1886–1891
Paul Cambon 1891–1898
Jean Antoine Ernest Constans 1898–1909
Maurice Bompard 1909–1914

See also
 Franco-Ottoman alliance
 French Ambassador to Turkey (1925–present)

References

External links
 French Ministry of Foreign Affairs

 
Ottoman
Ambassadors
France
Ambassadors of France

pl:Francuscy ambasadorzy w Turcji